The V-STOL Super Solution 2000 is an American STOL homebuilt aircraft that was designed by Dick Turner and produced by V-STOL Aircraft Corporation of Fort Myers, Florida. When it was available the aircraft was supplied as a kit for amateur construction.

Design and development
Developed from the V-STOL Solution, the Super Solution 2000 was developed for flight training, recreational flying and crop dusting. It features a cable-braced parasol wing, a two-seats-in-tandem open cockpit without a windshield, fixed conventional landing gear with wheel pants and a single engine in pusher configuration.

The aircraft is made from bolted-together aluminum tubing, with its flying surfaces covered in Dacron sailcloth. Original factory options included a full cockpit enclosure and dual controls.

The take-off speed while flying solo is.

The manufacturer estimated the construction time from the supplied kit as 100 hours.

Operational history
By 1998 the company reported that six kits had been sold and two aircraft were completed and flying.

In March 2014 no examples were registered in the United States with the Federal Aviation Administration, although one had been registered at one time.

Specifications (Super Solution 2000)

References

Super Solution 2000
1990s United States sport aircraft
1990s United States ultralight aircraft
1990s United States civil utility aircraft
Single-engined pusher aircraft
Parasol-wing aircraft
Homebuilt aircraft